Olivier Charroin and Martin Fischer were the defending champions, but decided not to participate.
Sanchai Ratiwatana and Sonchat Ratiwatana won the final 7–6(7–5), 6–7(3–7), [10–8] against Purav Raja and Divij Sharan

Seeds

Draw

Draw

References
 Main Draw

2013 Men's Doubles
Nottingham Challengeandnbsp;- Doubles